The 1947 Maryland Terrapins football team represented the University of Maryland in 1947 college football season as a member of the Southern Conference (SoCon). 

Jim Tatum served as the first-year head coach and replaced Clark Shaughnessy who had been asked to resign. Tatum replaced Shaughnessy's pass-oriented version of the T formation with the option-heavy split-T offense. During his nine-year tenure at College Park, Tatum would become the winningest coach in school history. In 1947, he got off to a good start and significantly improved from Shaughnessy's 3–6 record of the season prior.

The highlight of the season was a berth in the 1948 Gator Bowl, the first postseason game in school history. NCAA-scoring leader Lu Gambino ran for 165 yards and scored all three touchdowns for Maryland. The game ultimately ended in a stalemate.

Schedule

Personnel

Roster
The Maryland roster for the 1947 season consisted of the following players:

Pete Augsburger
John Baroni
Sam Behr
Harry Bonk
James Brasher
Paul Broglio
Fred Davis
Joseph Drach
Francis Evans
William Everson
Lu Gambino
Rudolph Gayzur
Chester Gierula
Jim Goodman
John Idzik
Eugene Kinney
Ray Krouse
Joe Kuchta
Jim LaRue
Stanford Lavine
Thomas McHugh
Thomas McQuade
James Molster
Al Phillips
Ed Pobiak
Wilbur Rock
Earl Roth
Jake Rowden
Edward Schwarz
Vernon Seibert
George Simler
Bernie Sniscak
Jack Targanrona
John Troha
Robert Troll
Joe Tucker
Vic Turyn
Hubert Werner
Elmer Wingate

Coaching staff
Jim Tatum, head coach
George Barclay, assistant coach
Flucie Stewart, assistant coach
Jim Meade, assistant coach
Houston Elder, assistant coach
Albert Woods, assistant coach
Bill Meek, assistant coach
Duke Wyre, trainer

Game summaries

South Carolina
Gambino scored three touchdowns and Maryland firmly held the momentum for the first three quarters. In the final period, South Carolina mounted a comeback attempt. Maryland player Gene Kinney intercepted a pass on the Terrapin 31-yard line to secure the victory, 19–13.

Delaware
Delaware entered the game atop a 32-game winning streak. Gambino again scored three touchdowns, with others added by Davis, Idzik, and Targarona. The Blue Hens responded to an 88-yard touchdown run by Gambino with a 90-yard score by Cole.

Richmond
Maryland avenged the previous season's loss to Richmond. Gambino scored twice and completed a pass to Simler for the third touchdown.

Duke (#17)
Maryland fumbles and interceptions helped Duke snap the three-game winning streak. Vernon Seibert scored the Terrapins' only score of the day. It was also the first touchdown ever scored by Maryland against Duke.

VPI
VPI scored twice in the first quarter after Maryland penalties and a turnover. In the fourth quarter, Maryland mounted a two-touchdown rally to spoil VPI's homecoming, 21–19. The decisive scores were due to a long Vic Turyn pass to Simler and a 32-yard dash by Idzik. McHugh made all three point after touchdown kicks, which proved to be the margin of victory.

West Virginia

Duquesne

North Carolina (#19)

Vanderbilt

North Carolina State

Georgia (Gator Bowl)

Awards
Lu Gambino was selected as a first-team All-Southern Conference back. Gambino and Eugene Kinney were named honorable mention All-Americans.

See also
Maryland Terrapins football under Jim Tatum (1947–1955)

References

Maryland
Maryland Terrapins football seasons
Maryland Terrapins football